A Man Betrayed is a 1936 American comedy crime drama film directed by John H. Auer.

Plot summary 

Frank Powell (Edward J. Nugent) works selling stock for an oil well. When a client comes to him with a letter from her nephew saying the well is a scam Powell becomes concerned and confronts his 3 bosses Carlton, Richards, and Burns. Feeling he is not getting straight answers he decides to fly immediately to Miami to investigate the wells. Worried Powell might find out the truth that Carlton, Richards and Burns used the investors money to play the stock market, Carlton commits suicide by shooting himself after recording a confession on his Dictaphone. Wanting the $100,000 life insurance Richards and Burns hire Tony Maroc and his gang to set up Carlton's body in Powell's apartment to make it look as if he's been murdered. Powell gets arrested as soon as his plane lands and is tried and found guilty of murder.

While being moved to the penitentiary to await execution Powell escapes when the kleptomaniac Gabby, a member of Sparks gang, whom he is handcuffed to breaks out. 
Powell goes to Burns apartment and threatens him and Richards with a gun. Powell's brother Reverend Curtis (Lloyd Hughes) shows up and together they flee the police and head to Sparks headquarters; a boxing gym. The Police show up and to avoid suspicion Curtis poses as a boxer and knocks out the champion, Roundhouse. His jaw now broken Roundhouse can no longer participate in the upcoming boxing match which Sparks (John Wray) has bet Tony $4000 on. Sparks tells Curtis he is to take Roundhouses place. If he loses Sparks turns Frank over to the police. However, if he wins Sparks will pay Curtis $500. Hiding out at the boxing gym Curtis goes into training. Tony becomes worried Curtis will easily win the fight and gets his girlfriend to chase after Curtis hoping to distract him from his training. When that doesn't work Tony finds out Curtis, who is now wanted for aiding a criminal, is Franks brother and has him arrested. Sparks decides to prove Franks innocents so Curtis will be set free. Sparks, his gang, and Frank go to Franks old apartment to investigate. Sparks proves Carlton couldn't have been shot in the apartment after he shoots of his gun and the neighbors come running. The group then heads to Carlton's old office. While looking around investigators from the insurance company show up saying they're investigating Franks innocents. They allow the gang to continue searching the office after being told they are "crime experts'. On the desk they find marks from where a knife has repeatedly been tossed into the top which leads them to Smokey, a member of Tony's gang who compulsively tosses a knife into wood surfaces. Sparks and 2 of his men interrogate Smokey until he confesses.

Richard and Burns begin to move Carlton's things out of his office when they find the Dictaphone roll in which he confesses his guilt and suicide. Richards breaks it to pieces right before 2 policemen show up to arrest the men for Carlton's murder. Richards says Carlton committed suicide to which the police tell him to prove it.

Cast 
Edward J. Nugent as Frank Powell
Kay Hughes as Marjorie Norton
Lloyd Hughes as Curtis Powell
John Wray as Sparks
Edwin Maxwell as Richards
Theodore von Eltz as Burns
Thomas E. Jackson as Detective Ryan
William Newell as Gabby
Smiley Burnette as Hillbilly
Christine Maple as Helen Vincent
John Hamilton as Mr. Carlton
Ralf Harolde as Tony Maroc
Grace Durkin as Gertrude
Carleton Young as Henchman Smokey
Mary Bovard as Apartment House Tenant

External links 

1936 films
1930s English-language films
American black-and-white films
1936 comedy-drama films
Republic Pictures films
Films directed by John H. Auer
Films produced by Nat Levine
American comedy-drama films
1930s American films